Don't Go Near the Water is a 1957 comedy film about a U.S. Navy public relations unit stationed on an island in the Pacific Ocean during World War II. It is an adaptation of the 1956 novel of the same name by William Brinkley.  Glenn Ford and Gia Scala star. This is the first of several service comedies that Ford appeared in after the huge success of The Teahouse of the August Moon. The movie was very successful and further solidified Ford's reputation as an adept comedic actor.

Plot

Lieutenant (j.g.) Max Siegel (Glenn Ford) and other US Navy personnel are stuck in a public relations unit far from the fighting. Lieutenant Commander Clinton T. Nash (Fred Clark), their commanding officer and a stockbroker in civilian life, refuses to allow anyone to transfer out. Much of Siegel's time is spent showing war correspondents (like obnoxious Gordon Ripwell (Keenan Wynn)) and visiting Congressmen around the island.

One day, Siegel spots beautiful local schoolteacher Melora Alba (Gia Scala). Despite some formidable obstacles, he eventually wins her love. However, they break up when he wants to live in New York City to further his career, while she feels she is needed on the island.

Meanwhile, Siegel's yeoman, Adam Garrett (Earl Holliman), falls in love with Navy nurse Alice Tomlen (Anne Francis), which constitutes a serious breach of Navy regulations, as Tomlen is an officer while Garrett is only an enlisted man. However, Siegel pretends to be dating her himself in order to give Garrett the opportunity to spend time with her. This couple also fall in love. When Nash finds out, Siegel suggests a fitting punishment would be a transfer to a fighting unit (something Garrett very much wants).

With the Army hogging the news headlines, Nash comes up with the idea to take an ordinary sailor and send him on a morale-boosting tour, all highly publicized. He chooses Farragut Jones (Mickey Shaughnessy) (a fine naval name). Unfortunately, Jones turns out to be foul-mouthed and heavily tattooed, not exactly what Nash had hoped for. He assigns Siegel to smooth out Jones's rough edges, with limited success.

Later, Siegel has to escort another war correspondent, the shapely and blonde Deborah Aldrich (Eva Gabor), when she finagles her way aboard a heavy cruiser on its way to a combat operation, much to Admiral Junius Boatwright's (Howard Smith) disapproval.

With the end of the war, Siegel realizes that he cannot live without Melora, and decides to remain on the island.

Cast

 Glenn Ford as Lieutenant (j.g.) Max Siegel
 Gia Scala as Melora Alba
 Earl Holliman as Adam Garrett
 Anne Francis as Lieutenant (j.g.) Alice Tomlen
 Keenan Wynn as Gordon Ripwell
 Fred Clark as Lieutenant Commander Clinton T. Nash
 Eva Gabor as Deborah Aldrich
 Russ Tamblyn as Ensign Tyson
 Jeff Richards as Lieutenant Ross Pendleton
 Mickey Shaughnessy as Farragut Jones
 Howard Smith as Admiral Junius Boatwright
 Romney Brent as Mr. Alba, Melora's father
 Mary Wickes as Janie, a nurse who enjoys the attention resulting from being one of the few American women on the island
 Jack Straw as Lieutenant Commander Gladstone
 Robert Nichols as Lieutenant Commander Hereford
 John Alderson as Lieutenant Commander Diplock
 Jack Albertson as Rep. George Jansen
 Charles Watts as Rep. Arthur Smithfield

Reception
According to MGM records, the film earned $4,265,000 in the US and Canada, and $1,875,000 elsewhere, resulting in a profit of $1,004,000.

See also
 List of American films of 1957

References

External links
 
 
 
 

1957 films
1957 romantic comedy films
CinemaScope films
American romantic comedy films
Films based on American novels
Films directed by Charles Walters
Films scored by Bronisław Kaper
Metro-Goldwyn-Mayer films
Military humor in film
Pacific War films
Films about the United States Navy in World War II
1950s English-language films
1950s American films